Vesyoly is a rural locality (a khutor) and the administrative center of Verkhnekurmoyarskoye Rural Settlement, Kotelnikovsky District, Volgograd Oblast, Russia. The population was 922 as of 2010. There are 14 streets.

Geography 
Vesyoly is located on the east bank of the Tsimlyansk Reservoir, 34 km northwest of Kotelnikovo (the district's administrative centre) by road. Pokhlebin is the nearest rural locality.

References 

Rural localities in Kotelnikovsky District